Davide Lepore (born 7 August 1968, in Rome) is an Italian voice actor and dubbing director. He contributes to voicing characters in anime, cartoons, movies, and more content.

Lepore is well known for providing the voice of the character Chris Griffin in the Italian-language version of the popular animated sitcom Family Guy. He is also well known for providing the voice of Milhouse Van Houten in the Italian-language version of The Simpsons.

He works at Dubbing Brothers, LaBibi.it, and other dubbing studios in Italy.

Voice work

Anime and animation
 Chris Griffin in Family Guy
 Milhouse Van Houten (Season 3-present), Professor Frink (Seasons 5-12), and Kang in The Simpsons
 Milhouse Van Houten in The Simpsons Movie
 Francis (Second voice) and Juandissimo Magnifico in The Fairly OddParents
 Numbah Two/Hoagie Gilligan (Second voice) in Codename: Kids Next Door
 Tōru Kazama in Crayon Shin-chan (First and second dubs)
 Duman in Winx Club
 Benny HaHa in Duel Masters
 Rekkit in Rekkit Rabbit
 Cletus Kasady/Carnage in Spider-Man: The Animated Series
 Sakai Jefferson Kōji in Hungry Heart: Wild Striker
 Jesse Greenwood in Free Willy
 Gallaxhar in Monsters vs. Aliens
 Munk in Happily N'Ever After 2: Snow White Another Bite @ the Apple
 Clifford in Clifford the Big Red Dog (TV series)
 Jimmy Gourd in VeggieTales
 Wakko Warner in Animaniacs
 Viral in Gurren Lagann
 Oobi in Oobi
 Bass in MegaMan NT Warrior
 Henry in Tomodachi Life: The TV Series
 Percy the Small Engine in Thomas and the Magic Railroad
 Gerald in Harvey Girls Forever!
 Bryson Jones in Sarah Lee Jones (since 2000)
 Charles in Frosty Returns
 Paco in Maya & Miguel
 Benny the Bat in Bear in the Big Blue House
 Screwy in Rolie Polie Olie
 Dan in LeapFrog
 Harry the Dog in Stanley
 Pico in TeachTown
 Krillin in Dragon Ball Z: Cooler's Revenge (First dub)
 Krillin in Dragon Ball Z: Return of Cooler (First dub)
 Makoto Kurumizawa in Boys Be... Yūsaku Hino in Kimagure Orange Road (Second dub)
 Eco in Lunar Jim Kintaro Oe in Golden Boy Bud Mint in KO Beast Gomamon in Digimon Adventure Gomamon in Digimon Adventure 02 Sergeant Stripes and Inspector Hector in Sergeant Stripes Linda Belcher in Bob's Burgers Hanappe Bazooka in Hanappe BazookaLive action shows and movies
 Paul Weston in The Hard Easy Vinnie Patterson in Home and Away Cooper Harris in EuroTrip Marcus in Hatchet Eric Hanson (Second voice) in Malcolm in the Middle Miles Novacek in Nick Freno: Licensed Teacher Roberto "Rober" Arenales in Un Paso Adelante Miles Novacek in Nick Freno: Licensed Teacher Chris Blake in Sea Patrol (Second dub)
 Malcolm Wyatt in Ally McBeal Jason Tiner in JAG Rob Norris in Catastrophe Danny Delgado/Black Bison Ranger in Power Rangers Wild Force Jeremy Peters in Boston Public Lachy in The Wiggles Randall Reese in The Nine (TV series) Alexei in Hostel (2005 film) Bobby Calzone in Drowning Mona Joe in Team America: World Police Leo Koenig in Funny People Rubin in Road Trip Denis Domaschke in Good Bye, Lenin!''

See also
 Non-English versions of The Simpsons

References

External links
 

Living people
Male actors from Rome
Italian male voice actors
Italian voice directors
1968 births